Gary Lee Plummer (born January 26, 1960) is a former American football linebacker who played in the National Football League (NFL) and the United States Football League (USFL). He was signed by the San Diego Chargers as a free agent in 1986 after playing three years in the USFL. He played college football at University of California, Berkeley.  Plummer won a Super Bowl ring with the San Francisco 49ers in Super Bowl XXIX.

College career
Plummer played his first two years of junior-college football at Ohlone College, and then transferred to the University of California, Berkeley, where he played nose tackle.

Professional playing career

Oakland Invaders
After going undrafted in the 1983 NFL draft, Plummer joined the Oakland Invaders of the USFL. He played three years for the team. He played in the 1985 USFL Championship game.  He wore #51 with the Invaders.

San Diego Chargers
After the USFL folded in 1985, Plummer was signed by the San Diego Chargers. He became a starter during his first season with the Chargers and started 106 of 119 games during the eight seasons he played there. He finished his career with the Chargers with 792 tackles, 3.5 sacks, and five interceptions.  He scored two touchdowns in his time with the Chargers.  His first was a 2 yard pass from Billy Joe Tolliver on October 7, 1990 vs. Pittsburgh.  His second came on a 1 yard run vs. Denver on November 11, 1990.  While with the Chargers he carried the ball 3 times for 9 yards.

San Francisco 49ers
Before the 1994 season, Plummer signed with the San Francisco 49ers. He played his final four seasons of his career with the 49ers and was a member of the 49ers Super Bowl XXIX victory over the  Chargers. After the 1997 season, Plummer retired with 1,029 tackles, 4.5 sacks, and six interceptions.

Broadcasting career
From 1998 until April 2011, Plummer was a color analyst for KNBR 49ers game broadcasts.  He was fired from this position due in large part to frequent criticism of the team during broadcasts. He also revealed that he suffered over 2500 concussions in the course of his career. Even when most of them were very mild Grade 1-type, he has been recovering from the cumulative effects.

References

1960 births
Living people
California Golden Bears football players
Oakland Invaders players
Ohlone Renegades football players
San Diego Chargers players
San Francisco 49ers announcers
San Francisco 49ers players
National Football League announcers
People from Fremont, California
Sportspeople from the San Francisco Bay Area
Players of American football from California